The chopin was a Scottish measurement of volume, usually for fluids, that was in use from at least 1661, though possibly 15th century, until the mid 19th century. The measurement was derived from the French measure chopine an old and widespread unit of liquid capacity, first recorded in the 13th century. A chopin is equivalent to 0.848 litres.

 1 chopin is 8 gills
 1 chopin is 2 mutchkins
 2 chopins is the equivalent of 1 (Scots) pint (or joug)
 16 chopins is the equivalent of 1 (Scots) gallon

References

See also
 Obsolete Scottish units of measurement

Obsolete Scottish units of measurement
Units of volume
17th-century establishments in Scotland
17th-century introductions
19th-century disestablishments in Scotland
Alcohol measurement